The 2016 Players Tour Championship Grand Final (officially the 2016 Ladbrokes Players Tour Championship Grand Final) was a professional ranking snooker tournament that took place between 22 and 27 March 2016 at the EventCity in Manchester, England. It was the eighth ranking event of the 2015/2016 season. The tournament was broadcast in the UK on ITV4.

Defending champion Joe Perry failed to qualify for this year finals having finished 51st on the Order of Merit. The tournament was won by Mark Allen
who beat Ricky Walden 10–6 in the 19-frame final, winning the £100,000 first prize. It was Allen's third  ranking event win and his first in Europe after two wins in China in 2012 and 2013.

Prize fund 
The breakdown of prize money is shown below:

The "rolling 147 prize" for a maximum break stood at £10,000. The sponsor pledged to double the prize for a 147 break and so the prize would have been £20,000.

Seeding list
The players competed in 7 minor-ranking tournaments to earn points for the European Tour and Asian Tour Orders of Merit. The top 24 from the European Tour and the top 2 from the Asian Tour qualified for the finals, plus 6 more from a combination of both lists.
Mark Selby withdrew for personal reasons and was replaced in the draw by Matthew Selt.

The seeding list of the finals was based on the combined list from the earnings of both Orders of Merit.

Main draw

Final

Century breaks

143, 127, 104  Ding Junhui
135  Martin Gould
134, 123, 119  Mark Allen
119  Barry Hawkins
114, 112, 111, 104, 103  Ricky Walden

112  Ali Carter
107  Ryan Day
106  Ben Woollaston
103  Shaun Murphy

References

2016
Finals
2016 in English sport
March 2016 sports events in the United Kingdom
Snooker competitions in England
Sports competitions in Manchester